Harold K. Forsen (born September 19, 1932 in St. Joseph, Missouri) in 1952, he married his high-school sweetheart Betty A. Webb while he served in the Air Force (1951–55). After his tour of duty was finished, he enrolled in the California Institute of Technology and earned his B.S. and M.S. in Electrical Engineering in 1959. Following graduation, Forsen worked at the General Atomics Company in San Diego California on various nuclear energy issues including nuclear fusion, which became an integral part of his career in later years.

He decided that a PhD was required to make significant contributions in the plasma physics field and enrolled in the Electrical Engineering Department at the Berkeley campus of the University of California. He obtained his PhD in 1965 under the mentorship of Professor Al Trivelpiece.  His career then turned toward the academic side and in 1965 he was hired into the Nuclear Engineering Department of the University of Wisconsin-Madison. It was there that he became well known internationally for his insight and scholarly work in the field of plasma physics.  He was also instrumental in starting the fusion technology program at Wisconsin.  Several of his PhD students went on to become leaders of the United States fusion energy program.

The next chapter in his life was in the area of nuclear fission and in 1973 he left the University of Wisconsin to lead a mostly classified program in the use of lasers to separate uranium-235 from uranium-238 at the Exxon Nuclear Company in Bellevue, Washington. He eventually became an Executive Vice President in the company. At Exxon he created many patents utilizing laser isotope separation. While at Exxon, Harold continued his “academic” role and served as the President and finally Chairman of the Board of the Pacific Science Center in Seattle, Washington for 6 years.  He also was a founding member of the Washington State Academy of Sciences board of directors. He was then lured (in 1981) to the Bechtel Company in San Francisco to be the Vice President and Manager of the Technology Group.  After serving in that capacity for 14 years, he retired in 1995.  He lived in three different locations after retirement; Kirkland, Washington, North Lake Tahoe, California, and Indio, California.

He served on numerous advisory and review panels, including the 1990 DOE Fusion Policy Advisory Committee (FPAC), established by then Secretary of Energy James D. Watkins.
Dr. Forsen is the recipient of many professional society and national awards, including the Arthur Holly Compton Award of the American Nuclear Society. He is a member of the American Academy of Arts and Sciences, a Fellow of the American Physical Society and the American Nuclear Society and was elected to the National Academy of Engineering in 1989. He was very active in the governance of the NAE an after retirement served as the Foreign Secretary for 8 years (1995-2003).  He was recently elected as a foreign associate to the Japanese Engineering Academy.

Harold died on March 7, 2012, at the age of 79.

Personal life
He was survived by his wife of 60 years, Betty, and the rest of his family: John Forsen (Gayle), Ron Forsen (Debbie), Sandy Hartrick (Tom), six grandchildren, a sister-in-law and her children.

See also
List of members of the National Academy of Engineering (Electric power and energy systems)

References

External links
http://www.nae.edu/27780.aspx
https://web.archive.org/web/20141104043932/http://www.washacad.org/about/board/forsen_harold.html
http://patents.justia.com/inventor/harold-k-forsen

http://www.nap.edu/openbook.php?record_id=11912&page=83

American nuclear engineers
Members of the United States National Academy of Engineering
People from St. Joseph, Missouri
1932 births
2012 deaths